Ous is a given name. Notable people with the name include:

Ous Ibrahim (born 1986), Iraqi footballer
Oussama Mellouli (nicknamed “Ous”; born 1984), Tunisian swimmer and Olympic medalist

See also
OUS (disambiguation)